The Business Development and Investment Corporation (BDIC) is a territorial Crown corporation wholly owned by the Government of the Northwest Territories. Its mandate is to help create and develop Northwest Territories businesses through financing, subordinate financing, venture capital and consulting services, with a focus on small and medium-sized enterprises.

History

The BDIC was founded in 2005. It was established pursuant to the Northwest Territories Business Development and Investment Corporation Act. It is the successor to both the former NWT Business Credit Corporation and the Business Development Corporation.

Services

The BDIC offers a variety of business services, either directly or through strategic partnerships with other organizations.

Financial Programs

Term Loans
This is the most common type of credit facility. Under the BDIC Act and its Regulations, a client may borrow up to total of $2,000,000 for their business. Loans are structured over a fixed period, with an amortization period of up to 25 years. Rates of interest are determined based on the credit worthiness of the client. Rates are usually prime rate plus 2,3 or 4 percent.

Irrevocable Letter of Credit
The BDIC offers an irrevocable letter of credit so a client may secure some form of credit from a conventional financial institution. Clients must pay a service fee for this product. Fees are determined based on risk.

Venture Investment Program
The BDIC may invest in a NWT business. The client must issue preferred shares to the BDIC. Although the BDIC may seek a seat on the client board of directs, in practice the BDIC rarely gets involved in the day-to-day operations of the business.

As profits increase, clients must pay dividends on the shares held by the BDIC. The client has the option to buy back these shares at an agreed upon rate.

Business Development Project Fund
The Business Development Project Fund (BDPF) is a contribution fund administered by the BDIC for entrepreneurs. Eligibility for the contribution is as follows:

Permitted business activities for basic the BDPF contribution are:

Start-up funding
Feasibility studies
Marketing expenses
Acquisition of business assets
Purchase of artisan supplies
Purchase of hunting tools

Clients must establish both need and viability.

Permitted uses of an aftercare contribution are:

Purchase of accounting software
Attendance at an educational seminar promoted by the BDIC (including travel and incidentals)
Succession planning

Subsidiaries
The BDIC owns a number of subsidiary companies. These subsidiaries create economic activity and employment in smaller NWT communities.

Business Services and Programs

Through a variety of partnerships with several organizations, the BDIC delivers educational seminars and video conference sessions for NWT entrepreneurs.

Corporate governance

The BDIC is an arms-length Crown Corporation. Members of the Board of Directors are appointed by the Minister of Industry, Tourism and Investment. Officers of the BDIC are members of the public service and report directly to the Board of Directors.

Decisions on granting funding rests with the Board of Directors. The Board in turn delegates this duty to the Application Review Committee (ARC), a committee of the CEO and senior management of the BDIC. Decisions rendered by ARC can be reviewed by the Board, but in practice the Board rarely interferes.

References

External links
 Business Development and Investment Corporation Official Website
 NWT Department of Justice – Northwest Territories Business Development and Investment Corporation Act
 NWT Department of Industry, Tourism and Investment
Northwest Territories Business Development and Investment Corporation fonds. Northwest Territories Archives

Crown corporations of the Northwest Territories
Companies based in Yellowknife
2005 establishments in Canada